The Thomond Feis  was an annual hurling competition organised by the Munster Council of the Gaelic Athletic Association between 1913 and 1956 for four of the inter-county teams in the province of Munster in Ireland. It was named for the ancient kingdom of Thomond (North Munster), which covered most of counties Limerick and Clare, as well as part of County Tipperary.  also competed, despite not being part of Thomond.

The series of games were usually played in the summer months after the completion of the National Hurling League and before the start of the Munster Senior Hurling Championship.  The prize for the winning team was a special set of gold medals for the winning team.  The tournament was effectively a pre-season warm-up for Munster's top hurling teams and was played as a straight knock-out.

The Thomond Feis was a pre-championship hurling competition, with large crowds attending games. Taken seriously by players, it offered a good indicator of a team's upcoming championship form. Over time, however, it fell out of favour and was eventually scrapped.

Roll of honour

References

Defunct hurling competitions
Munster GAA inter-county hurling competitions
1913 establishments in Ireland